Peggy Sue Wright (née Webb; born March 25, 1943) is a country music singer and songwriter, who had brief success as a country singer in the late 1960s. She is the middle sister of two popular country performers, Loretta Lynn and Crystal Gayle. Her older brother Willie "Jay" Lee Webb was a country music singer/songwriter in the 1960s.

Biography
Peggy Sue Wright was born Peggy Sue Webb in a cabin in Butcher Hollow, Kentucky on March 25, 1943. She is the second daughter and the sixth child born to Clara Marie "Clary" (née Ramey; May 5, 1912 – November 24,  1981) and Melvin Theodore "Ted" Webb (June 6, 1906 – February 22, 1959). Mr. Webb was a coal miner and subsistence farmer.

The family was poor; living hand-to-mouth and relying on her father's meager income. The seven Webb siblings in addition to Wright:

 Melvin "Junior" Webb (December 4, 1929 – July 1, 1993)
 Loretta Lynn (née Webb; April 14, 1932 – October 4, 2022)
 Herman Webb (September 3, 1934 – July 28, 2018)
 Willie "Jay" Lee Webb (February 12, 1937 – July 31, 1996)
 Donald Ray Webb (April 2, 1941 – October 13, 2017)
 Betty Ruth Hopkins (née Webb; born January 5, 1946)
 Crystal Gayle (born Brenda Gail Webb; January 9, 1951)

The family moved to Wabash, Indiana in 1955 due to her father's illness from working in the coal mines; he would die in 1959 of black lung disease. She began performing with Loretta and her brothers at venues around Wabash, Indiana.
Wright then became a featured act in Loretta's early shows in the 1960s. She also helped write a few of Loretta's compositions, including "Don't Come Home A' Drinkin' (With Lovin' on Your Mind)."
In 1969, she signed with Decca Records and released her debut single, "I'm Dynamite," which went into the Country Top 30. That same year she released an album of the same name. The second single from that album titled, "I'm Gettin' Tired of Babyin' You" also reached the Top 30.

After Peggy Sue had a hit with her most successful single, "All-American Husband," she left Decca Records after releasing two albums. Next, Wright recorded two albums in the 1970s for two small labels.

Peggy Sue was married twice. Her first marriage was to Douglas Wells (m.1964-div.1968); the second to Sonny Wright (m.1970-). From her first marriage, Peggy had one daughter: Doyletta Gayle; born May 30, 1967. Doyletta Gayle was named after Doyle Wilburn and Wright's sisters: Loretta Lynn and Crystal Gayle. Doyletta became a victim of spousal abuse when she was killed by her spouse on February 22, 1991.

After 1970, she didn't appear on the Billboard country charts until 1980. Beginning then, she had a small string of minor hits on her second husband Sonny Wright's label, Doorknob.

In 1986 she began performing as a background singer and designing stage costumes for her younger sister, Crystal Gayle.
She continues to perform with Gayle today. Occasionally they would both join up with older sister Loretta Lynn for a concert at her Hurricane Mills, Tennessee ranch.

Discography

Albums

Singles

A"I'm Gettin' Tired of Babyin' You" also peaked at No. 27 on the RPM Country Tracks chart in Canada.

References

External links
 Peggy Sue discography at Slipcue.com

1943 births
Living people
Loretta Lynn
People from Johnson County, Kentucky
American women country singers
American country singer-songwriters
American people of Irish descent
Country musicians from Kentucky
Decca Records artists
Singer-songwriters from Kentucky